Chen Wei (born February 1966) is a Chinese epidemiologist and virologist specializing in biodefense, and is currently working as a researcher and doctoral adviser at the Academy of Military Medical Sciences, and is an Academician of the Chinese Academy of Engineering (CAE). In September 2021, The Globe and Mail reported that Chen is also a major general in China's People's Liberation Army.

Biography
Chen was born in Lanxi County, Jinhua, Zhejiang, in 1966. She received her bachelor's degree in chemical engineering from the Zhejiang University in 1988. She obtained a master's degree at Tsinghua University in 1991. She attended the Academy of Military Medical Sciences where she obtained her doctor's degree in 1998. She became a faculty member of the academy upon graduation.

In 2013, Chen became a delegate of the People's Liberation Army to the National People's Congress.

On 10 July 2015, she was awarded the military rank of major general (shaojiang) by Central Military Commission chairman Xi Jinping.

She was a delegate to the 12th National People's Congress. In January 2018, she became a member of the 13th National Committee of the Chinese People's Political Consultative Conference. In November 2019, She was elected as an academician of the Chinese Academy of Engineering.

On May 30, 2021, she was elected vice president of the China Association for Science and Technology.

COVID-19 vaccine research

In 2020, Chen led a joint team of the Institute of Biotechnology, the Academy of Military Medical Sciences, and CanSino Biologics to develop Convidecia. The development team registered a Phase 1 trial in March 2020 and a Phase 2 trial in April 2020. It conducted its Phase III trials in Argentina, Chile, Mexico, Pakistan, Russia, and Saudi Arabia with 40,000 participants.

In February 2021, global data from Phase III trials and 101 COVID cases showed the vaccine had a 65.7% efficacy in preventing moderate symptoms of COVID-19, and 91% efficacy in preventing severe disease.

Convidecia is approved for use by some countries in Asia, Europe, and Latin America.

Honours and awards
 2009 Qiushi Outstanding Youth Award
 2010 National Science Fund for Distinguished Young Scholars
 2011 The 8th Chinese Young Women in Science Awards
 2017 Science and Technology Progress Award of the Ho Leung Ho Lee Foundation
 2020 China's national honorary title "the People's Hero"

See also
 Shi Zhengli
 Qiu Xiangguo

References

External links

1966 births
Living people
Chinese epidemiologists
Chinese virologists
Delegates to the 12th National People's Congress
Members of the 13th Chinese People's Political Consultative Conference
Members of the Chinese Academy of Engineering
People from Lanxi, Zhejiang
People's Liberation Army generals from Zhejiang
Educators from Jinhua
Scientists from Jinhua
Academic staff of Tsinghua University
Women epidemiologists
Women virologists
Zhejiang University alumni